Narynsuchus is an extinct genus of giant Goniopholidid Crocodylian. Because it has not yet been formally described, it is currently considered a nomen nudum. The name was first used in 1990 for fossil material found from a formation called the Balabansai Svita, which forms a lens in site FTA-30 of the Sarykamyshsai 1 locality in the Fergana Valley of Kyrgyzstan. The formation dates back to the Callovian stage of the Middle Jurassic. The type species of "Narynsuchus" is "N. ferganensis".Being semi-aquatic it is very similar to modern crocodiles. It ranged from 7–8 metres in length, and would have had a very similar lifestyle to the American alligator or Nile crocodile.

Material belonging to "Narynsuchus" consists of large and characteristically striated teeth as well as a robust left tibia. "Narynsuchus" is thought to have been larger than Sunosuchus, another crocodyliform from Sarykamyshsai 1, due to the greater size of the known elements belonging to the genus. This material was first recognized as belonging to a new crocodyliform in 1989, when it was referred to as an indeterminant species of Peipehsuchus.

References

Middle Jurassic crocodylomorphs
Middle Jurassic reptiles of Asia
Nomina nuda
Neosuchians